Misk'i Wat'a (Aymara misk'i honey; sweet, wat'a island, "honey (or sweet) island", also spelled Misqui Huata) is a mountain in the Bolivian Andes which reaches a height of approximately . It is located in the La Paz Department, Aroma Province, Patacamaya Municipality. Misk'i Wat'a lies southwest of Chullunkhäni. The Jach'a Jawira ("big river") originates west of the mountain. It flows to the northwest.

References 

Mountains of La Paz Department (Bolivia)